Steve Waterman may refer to:

 Steve Waterman (producer), film and television producer
 Steve Waterman (musician) (born 1960), British jazz trumpeter, composer and educator
 Steve Waterman (mathematician), inventor of Waterman polyhedra and the Waterman butterfly projection